Bruno Cotte (born 1945) is a French judge of the International Criminal Court. Prior to his appointment to the ICC Cotte was a member of the Cour de Cassation, France's supreme court of appeal. He had been Director for Criminal Affairs and Pardons in the French Ministry of Justice, Attorney General of the Versailles Court of Appeal and a public prosecutor of the Paris district court. He was elected to the ICC in 2008 to fill a judicial vacancy and was elected from the Western European and Others group of states. He is a member of the List A of judges, the list comprising those judges who are experts in criminal law.

References

1945 births
20th-century French judges
International Criminal Court judges
Living people
French judges of international courts and tribunals
21st-century French judges